Pathomtat Sudprasert (born 8 August 1993), or simply known as Junior, is a Thai professional footballer who plays as a goalkeeper for Thai League 2 club Chainat Hornbill.

External links
Pathomtat Sudprasert at soccerway.com

1993 births
Living people
Pathomtat Sudprasert
Pathomtat Sudprasert
Association football goalkeepers
Pathomtat Sudprasert
Pathomtat Sudprasert
Pathomtat Sudprasert